Moskabad (also Romanized as Moskābād and Meskābād; also known as Moshkābād) is a village in Belharat Rural District, Miyan Jolgeh District, Nishapur County, Razavi Khorasan Province, Iran. At the 2006 census, its population was 178, in 38 families.

References 

Populated places in Nishapur County